Yaroslav Yuryevich Matviyenko (born 22 March 1998) is a Russian football player.

Club career
He made his debut in the Russian Football National League for FC Yenisey Krasnoyarsk on 10 August 2019 in a game against FC Neftekhimik Nizhnekamsk.

On 2 February 2021, Armenian Premier League club FC Noah announced the signing of Matviyenko. After nine appearances and two goals, Matviyenko left Noah on 27 July 2022.

References

External links
 Profile by Russian Football National League
 
 

1998 births
Living people
Russian footballers
Association football midfielders
FC Yenisey Krasnoyarsk players
FC Noah players
Russian First League players
Armenian Premier League players
Russian expatriate footballers
Expatriate footballers in Armenia